The Mount Irid forest mouse (Apomys iridensis) is a forest mouse endemic to Mount Irid in Luzon, Philippines.

References

Apomys
Rodents of the Philippines
Mammals described in 2014
Endemic fauna of the Philippines